Cathrine Wessel is a Norwegian photographer based in New York City. Her work has been published in various international magazines, such as Elle, Women's Health, Glamour and Condé Nast Traveler.

Biography

Wessel studied at the International Center of Photography in New York City, where she started her career as a photographer's assistant.

Career 
Cathrine began her career documenting the music industry. From there she went on to shooting recording artists and music labels. Wessel moved from the music scene into sports and fashion, where the majority of her current work resides.

Wessel has shot advertising campaigns for many sports companies, such as  Nike, Nautica, Adidas and Reebok. Her photographic work interested Norwegian television brand TV2, and included Wessel in a 6-episode series about native Norwegians pursuing the American dream.

In addition to her work as a photographer, Cathrine and husband, Stian Tolnæs, own the luxury wool basics clothing line, With & Wessel. The collection is inspired by the old Norwegian traditions of wearing wool in layers.

References

External links 
 

1962 births
Norwegian photographers
Living people